Anjos do Arrabalde (English: Angels of the Outskirts) is a 1987 Brazilian drama film directed by Carlos Reichenbach.

The film won several awards at the 1987 Gramado Film Festival, including award for best actress for Betty Faria, (co-won with Zezé Motta on Night Angels) and best film.

In November 2015, Anjos do Arrabalde was selected by the Brazilian Association of Film Critics (Abraccine) as one of the 100 best Brazilian films of all time.

Cast 
Betty Faria as Dália
Clarisse Abujamra as Rosa
Irene Stefânia as Carmo
Vanessa Alves as Aninha
Ênio Gonçalves as Henrique
Emílio Di Biasi as Carmona
Ricardo Blat as Afonso
Carlos Koppa
José de Abreu as Soares
Nicole Puzzi
Lygia Reichenbach

References

External links 
 Anjos do Arrabalde at IMDb

1987 films
1987 drama films
Brazilian drama films
1980s Portuguese-language films
Brazilian independent films
Social realism in film
Films set in São Paulo
Films shot in São Paulo
1987 independent films